Fati Muhammad is a former film star in the Northern Nigerian film industry popularly known as  Kannywood. She is regarded as one of the  successful Hausa Actresses in the  early  2000s.

Filmography 

Fati started her film career from the time she first expressed her desire to enter the film industry at a young age. She started by showing Tahir Muhammad Fagge, a well-known filmmaker in the Kannywood industry, about her interest in the film industry. Tahir introduced her to Ishaq Sidi Ishaq an acclaimed image maker in the industry. It was then that Ishaq Sidi Ishaq started casting Fati in his film "Da Babu", her role in beauty and style was further highlighted in the film where she was immediately recognized from the film. This attracted the attention of other producers in the industry who have repeatedly included Fati in their films. Fati has acted in many films. Among them are; Sangaya, Zarge, Marainiya, Mujadala, Kudiri, Tutar So, Garwashi, Tawakkali, Gasa, Abadan Da'iman, Zo mu Zauna, Tangarda, Hujja, Al'ajabi, Halacci, Samodara, Zumunci, Murmushin Alkawari, Gimbiya, Bakandamiya, Taskan Rayuwa, Nagoma and Babban Gari.
Fati says she has stopped appearing in movies but is still making films.

Personal life 

Fatima married her co-actor Sani Mai Iska, leaving the movie industry, she and her husband moved to London. A few years after their marriage broke down, Fati returned home to Nigeria. Upon her return, she became involved in the film industry, but soon stopped short of seeing some of the changes in the industry. Fati remarried, where she married Umaru Kanu a filmmaker in the Kannywood industry who is a senior brother to singer Ali Jita. After a while their marriage came to an end. Fati has no biological children and is unmarried but she recently adopted a boy. In 2019 she anchored hopes at political rallies. Fati has made it clear that she is involved in politics.

References 

1989 births
Nigerian film actresses
Hausa-language mass media
Living people
Actresses in Hausa cinema
21st-century Nigerian actresses
Nigerian Fula people
Kannywood actors
Nigerian politicians
Nigerian filmmakers
Nigerian actor-politicians